Falkirk Fury, currently known as Sony Centre Fury for sponsorship reasons, is a Scottish basketball club based in the town of Falkirk, Scotland.

History
The club was established in 1992 by founders John Bunyan, Keith Bunyan and Gregor Gillies and originally consisted of players from Falkirk High School and local sports development players. The club now competes at all National League age groups, and supports an extensive and strong junior program.

The under 23 team rose to join the Scottish Men's National League in 1997. After finishing 2nd in the league for six consecutive seasons between 2006 and 2012, the club then won the title in 4 of the following  5 seasons.

The most illustrious player to come through the Fury program is former Great Britain international and co-captain Kieron Achara.

Honours

Home arenas
Mariner Centre (1992-2017)
Grangemouth Sports Complex (2017-present)

Players

Notable former players

Record in BBL competitions

Season-by-season records

See also
Scottish Basketball Championship Men
Glasgow Rocks

External links

Basketball teams in Scotland
Sport in Falkirk
Basketball teams established in 1992
1992 establishments in Scotland